Bridget the Midget may refer to:

 Bridget Powers (born 1980), American erotic film actress
 "Bridget the Midget (The Queen of The Blues)", a 1971 novelty song by Ray Stevens
 Mrs McClusky, headmistress in BBC children's drama series Grange Hill